Ngahuia Murphy is a New Zealand researcher and author. Murphy has written and published books focusing on Māori cultural practises and knowledge surrounding menstruation and is currently a recipient of the Health Research Council New Zealand postdoctoral fellowship.

Academic career 
Completing her Masters at Waikato University, Murphy's thesis focused on traditional menstruation practices, stories, and ceremonies in Māori society prior to European colonization. Murphy stressed the importance of this research, writing that the thesis aimed to challenge the framing of menstruation  "within deeply misogynist, colonial ideologies in some ethnographic accounts, distorting menstrual rites and practices beyond recognition", and linking menstruation in Māori communities to the concepts atua and whakapapa.

Murphy has likewise published books on menstruation, including Waiwhero: Red Waters: A Celebration of Womanhood He Whakahirahiratanga o te Ira Wahine - a Māori health resource.  Murphy told Stuff News that the books were about "reclaiming our ancient teachings that empower Māori women and the whole whanau".

Personal life 
Murphy was born in Murupara and is of Ngāti Manawa, Ngāti Ruapani ki Waikaremoana, Tūhoe, Ngāti Kahungunu, and Te Arawa descent. She is married to former Member of Parliament Nándor Tánczos, her partner since 2000. Together they have two children.

Publications

References

Living people
New Zealand women academics
New Zealand Māori academics
New Zealand Māori women academics
People from Murupara
Ngāti Manawa people
Ngāi Tūhoe people
Ngāti Kahungunu people
Te Arawa people
Year of birth missing (living people)